Zhang Zhi (born 18 February 1989) is a retired Chinese footballer.

Club career
Zhang Zhi graduated to China League Two side Shanghai East Asia's first team at the beginning of the 2006 league season and became the first captain of the club. He played as starter in center back position with Zhang Linpeng and helped the club win the league title and promoted to China League One in 2007. He was released by the club at the end of 2009 season after his disastrous performance in a league match which Shanghai East Asia lost to Shenyang Dongjin 3–2 and failed to promote to the first-tier. Zhang joined China League Two side Hubei CTGU Kangtian in March 2011. He transferred to another League Two club Hubei China-Kyle in 2012 and followed the club promote to the second tier in the 2012 season.

Zhang moved to his hometown club Guizhou Zhicheng in 2015. He made his debut for Guizhou on 14 March 2015 in a 1–1 away draw against Shenzhen F.C. On 19 September 2015, he scored his first senior goal which ensure Guizhou beat Hunan Billows 2–1. Zhang played eight league matches and scored one goal in the 2016 season as Guizhou won promotion to the Chinese Super League in 2016 season. On 28 April 2017, he made his Super League debut in a 3–1 away victory against Guangzhou R&F, coming on as a substitute for Min Junlin in the injury time. On 6 April 2021, Zhang would announce his retirement from professional football.

Career statistics
.

References

External links

1989 births
Living people
Chinese footballers
People from Guiyang
Footballers from Guizhou
Association football defenders
Chinese Super League players
China League One players
China League Two players
Shanghai Port F.C. players
Xinjiang Tianshan Leopard F.C. players
Guizhou F.C. players